The (Roman Catholic) Diocese of Awgu (Dioecesis Auguensis) in Nigeria was created on July 5, 2005, when it was split off from the Diocese of Enugu. It is a suffragan diocese of the Archdiocese of Onitsha. Its first bishop is John Ifeanyichukwu Okoye. The St. Michael Archangel Parish Church in Awgu is the largest church in the diocese and will therefore become its cathedral.

The Diocese covers an area of 1,310 km2 of the Enugu State, covering the local government areas: Awgu, Agbogugu, Inyi, Ndeabor, Nnenwe, Owelli and Oji Rivers (except the parish of Ukwuoba). Neighboring dioceses are Enugu to the north, Abakaliki to the east, Umuahia to the south and Awka to the west.

The total population in the diocese is 600,000, of which 360,000 are Roman Catholic. The diocese is subdivided into 42 parishes.

History

The people of Awgu geographical circumscription were a deeply religious people; who before the advent of
Christianity in Igboland had a common religious heritage of
a belief in One, Unseen, Omnipotent God. This Almighty
God was referred to as Ali Awgu (the Awgu earth goddess).
No wonder such popular expressions as "Ali Awgu Chewe
Nwawu" (Ali Awgu protect your child) is common among
Awgu people. This belief and sense of Sacred in this Ali
Awgu is peculiar to Awgu people. This belief and sense of
sacred in this Ali Awgu is peculiar to Awgu religious
tradition permeated and prevailed over the social, moral,
spiritual, mutual and stereological background of the
people before the beginning of the Christian religion.
The remotest beginning of the Catholic presence in the
Awgu division dates back to the acts of the French catholic
Missionaries that came to Eastern Nigeria under Fr. J. E.
Lutz in 1885 pitching their first tent at Holy trinity in
Onitsha. The evangelical activities of these French Holy
Ghost missionaries spread to Enugu Section and
consequently to Awgu sub-section by the early years of 20th
century. The missionary development in Awgu came
mainly from Eke town in Udi division, and partly from
Uturu in Okigwe. What we call Awgu Diocese today is
therefore a historical effect of synthetic, missionary roles
and contributes from Eke and Uturu Catholic Missions.
As early as 1912, Chief Onyeama (the warrant paramount
Chief of Eke town) in his bid to attract Western Education
for his children and people, had gathered a handful of
people (Catechumen) amidst the already existing Anglican
adherents that were found around Eke and Abor towns.

His invitation to the Catholic Missionaries brought Fr.
Joseph Shanahan to Eke in 1914; who laid the first
foundation of the old Eke Parish/School out of which
sprang the spread of other Catholic Missions in the current
Enugu part of Eastern Nigeria. As the incumbent and first
Bishop of Awgu, Rt. Rev. Dr. J. I. Okoye wrote in his B.D.
Thesis, Christianity in Mbanabo, its Advent growth, and
Future, "It was indeed at Eke that the religious tree which
spread its branches to other parts of Enugu Diocese was
planted, watered and nurtured". Eke Parish was the cradle
of the faith that has today become the Diocese of Nsukka,
Abakaliki, Makurdi, Oturkpo, Ogoja, and Enugu. It was in
1921 that the Roman Catholic Mission set up a School/Church at Oke-Oli Ali-Awgu (St. Michael's Awgu)
which attracted over 100 converts in less than one year.
They were received and harbored by Late Chief Chukwunta
Nwachumolie. The first teacher to St. Michael's
School/Church, Awgu, one Mr. Ofodiamah from Ogwashi
uku of the present Delta State of Nigeria. And the first Holy
Mass at St. Michael's Awgu was at Oke-Ali-Ohaja Awgu by
Rev. Fr. Grandin.

On the other hand, the missionary movement into Awgu
from Uturu, Okigwe was orchestrated by the
existence/construction of railway line from Enugu to Port
Harcourt in 1915. This made that Ndeabor Railway
Stations a whirlpool of so many itineraries, mercantile and
even evangelical interactions. This created and provided a pastoral relationship between St. Michael's Awgu and the
Roman Catholic Mission at Uturu, Okigwe (which was
nearer to Awgu than Eke) which was already established in
1912. In 1926, Rev. Fr. Treich, the first priest to minister to
the faithful at St. Michael's Church, Awgu from Uturu
prepared Catechumen who received their First Holy
Communion on 21 October 1926. However, given the
foundation of another Church in Awgu region at Mmaku,
which was raised to a parish status in 1922, St. Michael's
Awgu was under Mmaku Parish until 1948 when she was
made a parish too. Out of these two sources (Eke and
Uturu), the church continued to spread in Awgu areas with
joyful yet uneasy circumstances, on both sides of the
missionaries and mission converts. There were days of
thug-of-war between native ancestral religion and
Christianity and of oscillation of people from old traditional
civilization and the emerging one that is Christian and
exotic. Given limited pastors and prevalent pressures from
conflicting old and new faiths, it was really martyrdom like
and heroic to be a Christian then. But it was out of these
rocky roots that today we rejoice to the harvest of a young,
buoyant and vibrant Awgu ecclesiastical circumscription.

Awgu was created a diocese by Pope Benedict XVI on the 8th of July, 2005. On the 29th day of September, it was canonically erected and Most Rev. John Ifeanyichukwu Okoye ordained and enthroned as its first bishop.

References

External links
Catholic-hierarchy.org
Vatican press release on the creation 

Awgu
Roman Catholic Ecclesiastical Province of Onitsha